Dunk or Dunks may refer to:

People

Dunk
 Ben Dunk, (born 1987), Australian cricketer
 Bill Dunk, (born 1938), Australian golfer
 Chris Dunk (born 1958), American former tennis player
 Harrison Dunk (born 1990), English footballer
 Lewis Dunk (born 1991), English footballer
 Mark C. Dunk (born 1957), also known as Kosmo Vinyl, sometime manager of the English rock band The Clash and record producer
 Thomas Dunk (died 1718), English ironmonger, benefactor and Sheriff of London
 Thomas von der Dunk (born 1961), Dutch cultural historian, writer and columnist
 William Dunk (1897–1984), Australian government official

Dunks
 Henry Dunks, (1882– 1955), Australian politician

Places 

 Dunk, Queensland , a locality in the Cassowary Coast Region, Australia
 Dunk Island, off the coast of Queensland, Australia

Other uses
 Slam dunk, type of basketball shot
 Dunk (band), a 1990s Canadian power pop band
 Dunk (elephant), the first elephant to reside at the National Zoo in Washington, D.C.
 Dunk, a main character in the Tales of Dunk and Egg fantasy novella series by George R. R. Martin
 Dunk (mascot), mascot of the National Security Agency unveiled in 2015
 Dunk (2020 TV series), a Pakistani drama serial that premiered in 2020 on ARY Digital.

See also
 Dunking, a form of water torture
 Dunking (biscuit), dipping food into a drink
 Dunker (disambiguation)
 Dunkin (surname)
 Dunc, a given name